V is the fifth studio album by American psychedelic rock band Wooden Shjips. It was released on May 25, 2018, under Thrill Jockey.

Critical reception
V was met with "generally favorable" reviews from critics. At Metacritic, which assigns a weighted average rating out of 100 to reviews from mainstream publications, this release received an average score of 72, based on 14 reviews. Aggregator Album of the Year gave the release a 69 out of 100 based on a critical consensus of 10 reviews.

Track listing

References

External links
 
 
 V. at Thrill Jockey

2018 albums
Thrill Jockey albums